Beth Kephart is an  American author of non-fiction, poetry and young adult fiction for adults and teens. Kephart has written and published over ten books and has received several grants and awards for her writing. She was a National Book Award Finalist for her book "A Slant of the Sun: One Child’s Courage." She lives in Philadelphia with her husband and son. She is a writing partner in the marketing communications firm, Fusion Communications, and occasionally teaches and lectures at the University of Pennsylvania.

Kephart was first published in "Iowa Woman" magazine and has said that she was writing poems from the time she was quite young, and that she was very influenced by music and the sound of words. In a HarperCollins interview, she stated: "I loved to sing. I loved to perform, with my brother and sister, to the sound tracks of The Music Man or My Fair Lady or Windjammer. I always had rhymes sliding around in my head. So that even as I got older, I would return to Robert Louis Stevenson and Hans Christian Andersen to see how they created what they created. I would read F. Scott Fitzgerald and Ernest Hemingway and Sinclair Lewis, also, to learn about how words fit together. And then, of course, there was Black Beauty." [emphasis added].

Kephart is a graduate of the University of Pennsylvania and was a participant at the Bread Loaf Writing Conference, Middlebury, Vermont, with Jayne Anne Phillips; 1996 Prague Writing Conference, Czech Republic with William Gass and Jayne Anne Phillips; and 1995 Spoleto Writing Conference, Spoleto, Italy with Rosellen Brown and Reginald Gibbons, 1994.

Kephart is considered to be a prolific writer and reviewer and has penned reviews and essays for various publications, including:

 The New York Times
 Chicago Tribune
 Salon
 The Washington Post
 Book World
 The Wall Street Journal Europe
 Philadelphia (magazine)
 The Philadelphia Inquirer
 Family Circle
 Parenting
 Real Simple
 Reader's Digest
 New Jersey Life
 Pennsylvania Gazette
 Main Line Today

Undercover, her first book for young adults, was named a 2007 best book of the year by Amazon.com, Kirkus, and School Library Journal.

Honors and awards
 Speakeasy Poetry Prize (2005)
 Pew Fellowships in the Arts (2005)
 BookSense Pick (2005)
 National Endowment for the Arts Grant (2000)
 Leeway Grant for Creative Nonfiction (1998)
 Salon Best Book of the Year (1998)
 National Book Award, Nonfiction Finalist (1998)
 Pennsylvania Council on the Arts Top Fiction Grant (1997)
 Bread Loaf Merit Scholar for Fiction (1996)

Bibliography
 Dangerous Neighbors, Laura Geringer Books: HarperTeen, 2010
 Anderson, M. T., K. L. Going, Beth Kephart, and Chris Lynch, No Such Thing as the Real World, HarperTeen, 2010
 The Heart is Not a Size, Laura Geringer Books: HarperTeen, 2009
 House of Dance, Laura Geringer Books: HarperTeen, 2008
 Zenobia: The Curious Book of Business, Berrett-Kohler, 2008
 Undercover, Laura Geringer Books: HarperTeen, 2007
 Flow: The Life and Times of Philadelphia’s Schuylkill River, Temple University Press, 2007
 Ghosts in the Garden: Endings, Beginnings, and the Unearthing of Self, New World Library, 2005
 Big Shoes: In Celebration of Dads and Fatherhood, Al Roker and Friends, Hyperion, 2005
 Because I Said So, HarperCollins, 2005
 Seeing Past Z: Nurturing the Imagination in a Fast-Forward World, W.W. Norton, 2004
 Best American Sports Writing, Houghton Mifflin, 2003
 New York Times Writers on Writing, Volume II, Times Books, 2003
 The Kindness of Strangers, Lonely Planet, 2003
 Still Love in Strange Places: A Memoir, W.W. Norton, 2002
 Best American Sports Writing, Houghton Mifflin, 2001
 Wanderlust: Real-Life Tales of Adventure and Romance, 2000
 Into the Tangle of Friendship: A Memoir of the Things that Matter, Houghton Mifflin, 2000
 Mothers Who Think, Villard, 1999
 The Leap Years, Beacon Press, 1999
 A Slant of Sun: One Child's Courage, W.W. Norton, 1998

References

American women novelists
1960 births
Living people
Pew Fellows in the Arts
University of Pennsylvania alumni
20th-century American novelists
American young adult novelists
American women poets
21st-century American novelists
20th-century American women writers
21st-century American women writers
20th-century American poets
21st-century American poets
Women writers of young adult literature